Phodoryctis dolichophila is a moth of the family Gracillariidae. It is known from South Africa and Zimbabwe.

The larvae feed on Dolichos trilobus and Vigna species, including Vigna unguiculata. They mine the leaves of their host plant. The mine has the form of a moderate, more or less rounded, transparent or semi-transparent blotch mine.

References

De Prins, J. & De Prins, W. 2016. Global Taxonomic Database of Gracillariidae (Lepidoptera). World Wide Web electronic publication (http://www.gracillariidae.net)  (acc.30-Dec-2016)

Acrocercopinae
Moths of Africa
Moths described in 1961